I'm Alright is the second studio album by American country music singer Jo Dee Messina. It was released in 1998. Her highest selling album to date, it has been certified 2× Platinum for U.S. sales of two million copies. The album produced the singles "I'm Alright", "Bye, Bye", and "Stand Beside Me" — all of which reached Number One on the Billboard Hot Country Songs charts — as well as a cover of Dottie West's "A Lesson in Leaving" (titled "Lesson in Leavin'") and "Because You Love Me". Respectively, these last two singles reached #2 and #8 on the country charts.

Track listing

Personnel
Jo Dee Messina - lead vocals, backing vocals
Deborah Allen – backing vocals
Mike Brignardello – bass guitar
Robin Lee Bruce – backing vocals
Pat Buchanan – electric guitar
Larry Byrom – acoustic guitar
Glen Duncan – fiddle, mandolin
Paul Franklin – pedal steel guitar
Ralph Friedrichsen – backing vocals
Byron Gallimore – electric guitar
Sonny Garrish – pedal steel guitar
Camillie Harrison – backing vocals
Dann Huff – electric guitar 
Jeff King – electric guitar
Michael Landau – electric guitar
Brent Mason – electric guitar 
Terry McMillan – percussion
Steve Nathan – piano, keyboards
Kim Parent – backing vocals
Chris Rodriguez – backing vocals
Lonnie Wilson – drums
Curtis Young – backing vocals

Charts

Weekly charts

Year-end charts

Singles

References

1998 albums
Curb Records albums
Jo Dee Messina albums
Albums produced by Byron Gallimore
Albums produced by Tim McGraw